James Edgar Fairburn (September 12, 1927 – March 28, 2015) was a Canadian ice hockey player with the Penticton Vees. He won a gold medal at the 1955 World Ice Hockey Championships in West Germany. He also played professionally for the San Francisco Shamrocks, Minneapolis Millers, Portland Eagles, Victoria Cougars, and New Westminster Royals.

References

1927 births
2015 deaths
Canadian ice hockey right wingers
Ice hockey people from Saskatchewan
Sportspeople from Regina, Saskatchewan